Kürd-Dam is a village in the Kalbajar District of Azerbaijan.

This village came under the occupation of the self-proclaimed Republic of Artsakh during the First Nagorno-Karabakh war. It was returned to Azerbaijan on 25 November 2020 per the 2020 Nagorno-Karabakh ceasefire agreement. It is suspected that this village has undergone a name change or no longer exists, as no Azerbaijani website mentions it under this name.

References
 

Populated places in Kalbajar District
Abolished villages in Kalbajar District